Kenneth Monfore "Monte" Nitzkowski (September 7, 1929 – July 28, 2016) was an American former competition swimmer and water polo coach.  He represented the United States in the 200-meter butterfly at the 1952 Summer Olympics in Helsinki, Finland, where he finished with the eleventh-best time overall.  Nitzkowski acted as the U.S. water polo assistant coach at the 1968 Olympics and was appointed head coach for the 1972, 1980 and 1984 games.

After transferring from Fullerton Junior College, he swam and played water polo for the UCLA Bruins in 1950 and 1951. He became one of the world's foremost authorities in water polo by coaching Long Beach City College to 32 conference water polo championships and 12 conference swim titles during 1954 to 1989.

Nitzkowski was inducted into the International Swimming Hall of Fame in 1991, the USA Water Polo Hall of Fame in 1993, the Fullerton College Athletic Hall of Fame in 2005, and the UCLA Athletic Hall of Fame in 2006. In 2016, he was inducted into the National Polish-American Sports Hall of Fame.

See also
 List of members of the International Swimming Hall of Fame
 List of University of California, Los Angeles people

References

Bibliography
 Nitzkowski, Monte, United States Tactical Water Polo, Sports Support Syndicate / Mark Rauterkus (1994).  .

External links
 

2016 deaths
1929 births
American male breaststroke swimmers
Olympic swimmers of the United States
Sportspeople from Pasadena, California
Swimmers at the 1952 Summer Olympics
UCLA Bruins men's swimmers
UCLA Bruins men's water polo players
American water polo coaches
United States men's national water polo team coaches
Water polo coaches at the 1972 Summer Olympics
Water polo coaches at the 1984 Summer Olympics
American people of Polish descent